The Zhenskaya Hockey League (ZhHL), officially called the Women's Hockey League (WHL), is a professional ice hockey league in Eurasia, currently comprising nine teams: eight from Russia and one from China. The league is also known as the PariMatch Women's Hockey League for sponsorship reasons.

The league was founded via a joint partnership of the Kontinental Hockey League (KHL) and the Ice Hockey Federation of Russia (FHR) on 19 June 2015. It replaced the Russian Women's Hockey League (RWHL), which had been founded in 1995 and was operated by the FHR alone.

History
The creation of the Zhenskaya Hockey League was announced on 12 September 2014 at a meeting of Alexander Medvedev, president of the Ice Hockey Federation of Russia (FHR), and Vladislav Tretiak, president of the Kontinental Hockey League (KHL). The parties expressed their readiness to jointly establish the ZhHL and to achieve the dream of taking women's hockey in Russia to a new level of development. However, the FHR established the Zhenskaya Hockey League independently. There was a meeting with representatives of different Russian women's hockey teams on 2 July 2014. On the same day, the Honored Master of Sports, Alexei Yashin, was elected as president of the league while Yevgeny Chizhmin was appointed as the league's executive director.

However, the process of creating the league stalled because of a disagreement of the KHL with the fact that the Ice Hockey Federation of Russia established the league without reaching an agreement with the KHL, and on 22 December 2014, Alexei Yashin said in an interview with Championat.com: "While all this is a little suspended, what will happen next is hard for me to say. The management has made such a decision about changes in the KHL, which is what it is. I have a very good relationship with Alexander Ivanovich Medvedev. I think he did a lot for our hockey. I have not talked with Dmitry Chernyshenko yet. As for the women's league, when we talked, there was a certain situation that the KHL, FHR and Ruslan Gutnov would participate in the creation and development of this project. Now, while this process has slowed down, it's difficult for me to talk about terms."

The KHL, with the FHR, returned to the subject of the ZhHL in 2015. On 23 April 2015, the FHR Executive Committee voted to transfer the rights to host the women's ice hockey Russian Championship to the KHL. On 19 June 2015, the KHL established the Zhenskaya Hockey League, holding a presentation of a new league in the Ministry of Sport of Russia. On 8 September 2015, after the first matches of the championship of the ZhHL, the Board of Directors of the KHL approved the Rules of the League Championship.

Prior to the 2016–17 season, an eighth team, Dinamo Kursk, was supposed to be added to compete in the league. However, on 5 September 2016, despite the league taking all possible measures to ensure they would take part, Dinamo Kursk ultimately withdrew from the competition due to unresolved organizational and logistical issues. On 25 July 2019, the Shenzhen KRS Vanke Rays announced it was joining the ZhHL for the 2019–20 season.

Teams

2022–23 season 

*Temporary relocation since 2021–22 season

Source:

Russian Champions

1996 : Luzhniki Moscow (HC SKIF)
1997 : CSK VVS Moscow (HC SKIF)
1998 : CSK VVS Moscow (HC SKIF)
1999 : Viking Moscow (HC SKIF)
2000 : Spartak-Mercury Yekaterinburg
2001 : SKIF Moscow (HC SKIF)
2002 : SKIF Moscow (HC SKIF)
2003 : SKIF Moscow (HC SKIF)
2004 : SKIF Moscow (HC SKIF)
2005 : SKIF Moscow (HC SKIF)
2006 : HC Tornado
2007 : HC Tornado
2008 : SKIF Nizhny Novgorod (HC SKIF)
2009 : HC Tornado
2010 : SKIF Nizhny Novgorod (HC SKIF)
2011 : HC Tornado
2012 : HC Tornado
2013 : HC Tornado
2014 : SKIF Nizhny Novgorod (HC SKIF)
2015 : HC Tornado
2016 : HC Tornado
2017 : HC Tornado
2018 : Agidel Ufa
2019 : Agidel Ufa
2020 : KRS Vanke Rays
2021 : Agidel Ufa
2022 : KRS Vanke Rays

Russian Champions by season

All-time Russian Championship titles

References

External links
 Official website (in Russian)
  
  
Zhenskaya Hockey League at EliteProspects.com

 Women's Hockey League at Eurohockey.com

Women
Women's ice hockey leagues in Europe
Lea
Women's sports leagues in Russia
Professional ice hockey leagues in Russia